Johann Hadji Argyris FRS (Greek: Ιωάννης Χατζι Αργύρης; 19 August 1913 – 2 April 2004) was a Greek pioneer of computer applications in science and engineering, among the creators of the finite element method (FEM), and lately Professor at the University of Stuttgart and Director of the Institute of Structural Mechanics and Dynamics in Aerospace Engineering.

Education 
He was born in Volos, Greece but the family moved to Athens where he was educated in the Classical Gymnasium.

He studied civil engineering for four years in the National Technical University of Athens and then in the Technical University Munich, receiving his Engineering Diploma in 1936.

Following his escape from Nazi Germany he completed his Doctorate at ETH Zurich in 1942.

Career
His first job was at the Gollnow company in Stettin, where he was involved among other things in high radio transmitter masts. In 1943, he joined the research department of the Royal Aeronautical Society in England. Starting from 1949 he was lecturer in aeronautical engineering at the Imperial College London of the University of London, where he assumed a chair in 1955.

In 1959, Argyris was appointed a professor at the Technical University of Stuttgart (today University of Stuttgart) and director of the Institute of Structural Mechanics and Dynamics in Aerospace Engineering. He created the Aeronautical and Astronautical Campus of the University of Stuttgart as focal point for applications of digital computers and electronics.

Argyris was involved in and developed to a large extent the Finite Element Method along with Ray William Clough and Olgierd Zienkiewicz after an early mathematical pre-working of Richard Courant.

Awards and honours
Argyris was awarded the Royal Aeronautical Society Silver Medal in 1971.

He was elected a Fellow of the Royal Society in March 1986. His nomination reads:

Personal life
When World War II started Argyris was in Berlin at The Technical University. He was arrested and interned accused of passing research secrets to the Allies. However he was saved from execution by Admiral Canaris (also of Greek descent) who arranged his escape. After swimming the Rhine during an air-raid, he made his way to Switzerland. Here he entered ETH Zurich to complete his Doctorate.

Argyris died in Stuttgart and is buried in the Sankt Jörgens Cemetery in the city of Varberg, Sweden.

His uncle, Constantin Carathéodory, was a Greek mathematician of the Modern Era.

References

1913 births
2004 deaths
Aerospace engineers
Structural engineers
Academics of Imperial College London
Greek academics
20th-century Greek engineers
Engineering educators
Royal Medal winners
National Technical University of Athens alumni
Technical University of Munich alumni
People from Volos
Fellows of the Royal Society
Royal Aeronautical Society Silver Medal winners
Knights Commander of the Order of Merit of the Federal Republic of Germany
Recipients of the Order of Merit of Baden-Württemberg
Greek expatriates in Germany